Fox River (also Foxriver) is a community located in the village of Salem Lakes, Kenosha County, Wisconsin, United States.

History
A post office called Fox River was established in 1866, and remained in operation until it was discontinued in 1929. The community was named from its location on the Fox River.

Notes

Populated places in Kenosha County, Wisconsin
Neighborhoods in Wisconsin